Ordinary Magic is a 1993 Canadian film about a boy who is raised in India by his father. The story is based on the novel Ganesh by Malcolm Bosse with Canada substituting in the film for the book's Midwestern USA location. This film marked the debut of Ryan Reynolds.

Plot
Jeffrey/Ganesh (Ryan Reynolds) has been raised with the ideals of social activism as part of his everyday life. His father spends the better part of their lives fighting for social justice in India. After his father dies, fifteen-year-old Jeffrey is sent to live with his aunt Charlotte (Glenne Headly) in the small town of Paris, Ontario. Through several comedic situations and with considerable effort, he manages to make friends and fit into his new, much smaller world of his. However, when his aunt receives an unfair eviction notice from her sleazy landlord (Paul Anka), every bit of his background and training comes into play, as he works with her to put on a well-publicized hunger strike, or Satyagraha, which wins the admiration of the local citizens.

Cast

References

External links
 
 

Canadian drama films
English-language Canadian films
1993 films
Films based on American novels
1993 drama films
Films about human rights
Films shot in Sri Lanka
Films directed by Giles Walker
Films scored by Mychael Danna
1990s English-language films
1990s Canadian films